Phenindione is an anticoagulant which functions as a Vitamin K antagonist.

Phenindione was introduced in the early 1950s. It acts similar to warfarin, but it has been associated with hypersensitivity reactions, so it is rarely used and warfarin is preferred.

References

External links 
 

Vitamin K antagonists
Indandiones